Mathew J. Mossburg (born February 21, 1967, in Silver Spring, Maryland) is a business owner and former Republican legislator in the Maryland House of Delegates.

Education
Delegate Mossburg was educated at Puritan Christian School in Laytonsville, MD.  He graduated from Georgetown University Bachelor's degree in 1992.

Career

Mossburg was a one-term delegate from the heavily Democratic Montgomery County, Maryland. District 39, in 1994, was fully Republican with Mossburg, W. Raymond Beck, and Barrie S. Ciliberti. However, Maryland Governor Parris Glendening redrew many districts in the Democrats' favor. Though his original map was redrawn by the court system, Republicans suffered with all three in this district losing in the 1998 election.

While a member of the Maryland House of Delegates, Mossburg was a member of the Economic Matters Committee from 1995 until 1996, the Appropriations Committee in 1997, and the Commerce and Government Matters Committee from 1998 until 1999.

Election results
1998 Race for Maryland House of Delegates – District 39
Voters to choose three:
{| class="wikitable"
|-
!Name
!Votes
!Percent
!Outcome
|-
|-
|Charles E. Barkley, Dem.
|17,020
|  18%
|   Won
|-
|-
|-
|Paul Carlson, Dem.
|16,670
|  18%
|   Won
|-
|-
|Joan F. Stern, Dem.
|16,515
|  18%
|   Won
|-
|-
|Barrie S. Ciliberti, Rep.
|14,420
|  16%
|   Lost
|-
|-
|Walter McKee, Rep.
|14,412
|  16%
|   Lost
|-
|-
|Mathew Mossburg, Rep.
|13,439
|  15%
|   Lost
|}

1994 Race for Maryland House of Delegates – District 39
Voters to choose three:
{| class="wikitable"
!Name
!Votes
!Percent
!Outcome
|-
|-
|Mathew Mossburg, Rep.
|13,119
|  17%
|   Won
|-
|-
|W. Raymond Beck, Rep.
|12,311
|  16%
|   Won
|-
|-
|Barrie S. Ciliberti, Rep.
|12,897
|  16%
|   Won
|-
|-
|Charles E. Barkley, Dem.
|12,137
|  15%
|   Lost
|-
|-
|Anise Key Brown, Dem.
|10,987
|  14%
|   Lost
|-
|-
|Anthony J. Santangelo, Dem.
|10,939
|  14%
|   Lost
|-
|-
|Patricia Cummings, Ind.
|6,471
|  8%
|   Lost
|}

References

External links
 House of Delegates profile page

1967 births
Living people
Georgetown University alumni
Republican Party members of the Maryland House of Delegates
People from Silver Spring, Maryland
Businesspeople from Maryland